Piotta is a stage name of Tommaso Zanello (born 26 April 1974 in Rome, Italy), an Italian rapper. Piotta, which in Roman dialect means "100 liras", became famous with his song "Supercafone" which describes the Coatto (Roman suburban impolite, politically incorrect chav).

Piotta's single "La Mossa del giaguaro" hit #15 on the Italian charts in 2000.

Now considered a "veteran" of Italian hip hop, Piotta set up a record label, La grande onda, with a focus on emerging Italian musicians.
In 2015 he worked with Afrika Bambaataa for his album "Nemici".

Discography
Comunque vada sarà un successo, 1998
Comunque vada sarà un successo '99, 1999
Democrazia del microfono, 2000
La Grande Onda, 2002
Tommaso, 2004
Multi Culti, 2007
S(u)ono Diverso, 2009
Odio gli indifferenti, 2012
...senza Er, 2013
Interno 7 (Lato A) EP, 2018

References

1974 births
Living people
Musicians from Rome
Italian rappers